The sixth season of Friends, an American sitcom created by David Crane and Marta Kauffman, premiered on NBC on September 23, 1999. Friends was produced by Bright/Kauffman/Crane Productions, in association with Warner Bros. Television. The season contains 25 episodes and concluded airing on May 18, 2000.

Reception
Collider ranked it #5 on their ranking of the ten Friends seasons, and wrote that "The One Where Ross Got High" was its best episode.

Cast and characters

(In particular, Introduced in season 6 or Only in season 6)

Main cast
 Courtney Cox as Monica Geller
 Jennifer Aniston as Rachel Green
 Lisa Kudrow as Phoebe Buffay
 Matt LeBlanc as Joey Tribbiani
 Matthew Perry as Chandler Bing
 David Schwimmer as Ross Geller

Recurring cast
 Elle Macpherson as Janine LaCroix
 Alexandra Holden as Elizabeth Stevens
 Bruce Willis as Paul Stevens
 Reese Witherspoon as Jill Green
 Tom Selleck as Richard Burke
 James Michael Tyler as Gunther
 Ron Glass as Russell, the Divorce Lawyer

Guest stars
 
 Elliott Gould as Jack Geller
 Christina Pickles as Judy Geller
 June Gable as Estelle Leonard
 Jane Sibbett as Carol Willick
 Jessica Hecht as Susan Bunch
 Conchata Ferrell as the judge
 Ralph Lauren as himself
 Joanna Gleason as Kim
 Missi Pyle as Hillary
 Kristian Alfonso as Hope Brady
 Mitchell Whitfield as Barry
 Paul Gleason as Jack 
 Pat Finn as Dr. Roger
 Louis Mandylor as Carl
 Oliver Muirhead as the jeweller
 Brian Dunkleman as the customer

Episodes

Notes

References

External links
 

06
1999 American television seasons
2000 American television seasons